2K Drive is a racing game developed by Lucid Games and published by 2K Sports for iOS in 2013.

Reception

The game received "average" reviews according to the review aggregation website Metacritic.

References

External links
 

2013 video games
2K Sports games
IOS games
IOS-only games
Lucid Games games
Racing video games
Video games developed in the United Kingdom